Ivane Javakhishvili Tbilisi State University (often shortened to its historical name, Tbilisi State University or TSU) is a public research university established on 8 February 1918 in Tbilisi, Georgia. Excluding academies and theological seminaries, which have intermittently functioned in Georgia for centuries, TSU is the oldest university in Georgia and the Caucasus region. The total enrollment is over 23,500 students, and there are 5,000 faculty and staff members (collaborators) overall. According to the U.S. News & World Report university rankings, TSU is ranked 398th in the world, tied with the University of Warsaw.

The university has five branches in the regions of Georgia, seven faculties, 60 scientific-research laboratories and centers, a scientific library (with 3,700,000 books and periodicals), seven museums, publishing house and printing press (newspaper Tbilisis Universiteti).

The main founder of the university was a Georgian historian and academician, Ivane Javakhishvili. Among the co-founders were also several scientists, including Giorgi Akhvlediani, Shalva Nutsubidze, Dimitri Uznadze, Grigol Tsereteli, Akaki Shanidze, Andrea Razmadze, Korneli Kekelidze, Ioseb Kipshidze, Petre Melikishvili and Ekvtime Takaishvili. Professor Petre Melikishvili, a Georgian chemist, became the first rector of TSU.

The Rector of TSU since September 2016 has been Giorgi Sharvashidze. TSU has six faculties: Law, Economics and Business, Humanities, Medicine, Social and Political Sciences, Exact and Natural Sciences, and the International School of Economics at Tbilisi State University as an autonomous graduate school of economics.

History

Tbilisi State University was founded in 1918 owing to the leadership of Georgian historian Ivane Javakhishvili and the group of his followers. It was the first and the only educational body of this type in Caucasus Region by that time. The university is housed in the former building of Georgian Nobility Gymnasium constructed by the architect Simon Kldiashvili from 1899 to 1906.

Georgia has a tradition of education, as evidenced by the functioning of the School of Philosophy and Rhetoric of Phazisi in Colchis (4th century); as well as the setting up of cultural-enlightenment centers in Palestine (5th century), Syria (6th century), Greece (10th–15th centuries) and Bulgaria (11th century); Gelati and Iqalto Academies in Georgia (11th–12th centuries); However, as a result of political-economic decrease and at last becoming the colony of Russia, there had been no national higher educational Institution in Georgia for the next few centuries.

After Georgia became independent and declared itself a national democratic state, one of the first achievements of the Georgian people at the beginning of the 20th century was the foundation of the Georgian National University in Tbilisi. Afterwards, through the Bolshevik and Communist period, in spite of the forced ideology and fierce censorship, Tbilisi State University maintained schools in mathematics, psychology, philosophy, linguistics, and historiography. The foundation of the Academy of Science of Georgia and other higher educational institutions was encouraged by the university.

The university was opened on 26 January 1918, the day of remembrance of the Georgian King David the Builder. A church in the University garden, named after the King, has been functioning since 5 September 1995. In 1989 the university was named after its founder - Ivane Javakhishvili.

Petre Melikishvili, a chemist and professor, was elected as the first rector of the university. At its commencement, the university had one faculty - that of philosophy. Ivane Javakhishvili, a Georgian historian, delivered the first lecture. At the beginning of 1918 the board of professors and lecturers numbered 18, the student body of the university counted 369 students and 89 free listeners.

Today the number of professors involved in tuition and training amounts to 3275, including 55 academicians and corresponding member of the academy, 595 professors and doctors, 1246 assistant professors and candidates of sciences.

Over 35 thousand students are studying at the University and its eight regional branches. Important changes at the university began on 25 April 1994, when the scientific council of the University adopted "The Concepts of University Education"page3-5, according to which since the year 1994 the university has transferred to the two-stage form of study (the step-by-step rearrangements were launched in 1992).

At the end of the I stage of the reform implemented, at the beginning of 2005, the bodies functioning at TSU were: 22 faculties with 184 chairs, 8 branches with 46 faculties, 3 scientific-research and study-scientific institutes, 81 scientific-research laboratories and centers, 161 study laboratories and rooms, clinical hospitals and diagnostic centers, publishing and editorial houses, the library with 3,650,000 items, 5 dormitories. 95 educational programs were used at the bachelor's course, 194 at master's studies, and 16 at the single-step tuition.

Schools that came into being at Tbilisi University were: 
 Mathematics (Andrea Razmadze for whom the department was renamed in 1944, Nikoloz Muskhelishvili, Ilia Vekua, Viktor Kupradze, Andro Bitsadze and others), 
 Physics (Elephter Andronikashvili, for whom the Institute was renamed in 1999, Mate Mirianashvili, Vagan Mamasakhlisov, Givi Khutsishvili Albert Tavkhelidze and others), 
 Psychology (Dimitri Uznadze and others), 
 Physiology (Ivane Beritashvili and others). 
 National Scholarly Schools of Georgian Historiography (Ivane Javakhishvili and others), 
 History of Literature (Korneli Kekelidze and others), 
 Georgian Philosophy (Shalva Nutsubidze and others), 
 Art Studies (Giorgi Chubinashvili and others), 
 Georgian and Caucasian Linguistics (Akaki Shanidze, Giorgi Akhvlediani, Arnold Chikobava and others), 
 Oriental and Classical Philology (Grigol Tsereteli, Simon Qaukhchishvili, Giorgi Tsereteli and others).
 Kartvelology (Kartvelian Studies)

The chairs and scientific research departments serve for preparation of postgraduate students and scientific degrees. 26 qualification councils operate for conferring scientific degrees in almost all fields of science.

Medical education was restored at the university in 1994. Originally the specialty of medicine was opened at the faculty of biology and medicine, and the faculty of medicine became an independent unit in 2000. A center for the Management of Health Care and the Department for Continuous Medical Education were opened, and the board of trustees of medicine and medical information service were founded.  The university diagnostic center provides the health care of the professors and lecturers and collaborators of the University.

A printing press was set up in 1923 and a publishing-house in 1933. The University Archive was founded in 1933. The scientific edition "The Proceedings of Tbilisi University" has been publishedisince 1919. The program Textbooks for Students has been functioning since 1996. The University publishes two weekly newspapers "Tbilisis Universiteti" (since 1927) and "Kartuli Universiteti" (since 1998).

International conferences and symposia have been held at Tbilisi University such as International symposia of psychologists (1979, 1986), symposia on Georgian art (II-1977, IV- 1983, VI- 1989), international symposia on the teaching of the Russian language and literature (1980, 1984, 1988), problems of German literature (1983, 1989), Classical philology (1969, 1975, 1980,1990, 1995, 1996), religion and ethics (1907, international private law (1985), international symposia on Kartvelian Studies (I-1987, II-1988, III-1995).

Caucasian studies is one of the major trends of scholarly research. "Caucasica", an international scholarly journal, has been published since 1998.

International conferences dedicated to major problems of the present day have been held at the University: "Caucasus, problems of democratization" (1995), "The law reform in Georgia" (1995), "The University reform in Georgia" (1995), "Hellenistic Studies over the centuries" (2000). Summer schools are held for foreign scientists in Kartvelian studies (Kartvelologists).

Faculties
TSU has seven faculties:

Exact and Natural Sciences
The faculty has eight departments, in mathematics, physics, chemistry, geography, computer sciences, biology, geology, electric and electronic engineering. 11 bachelor, 18 master and 10 doctoral degree programs operate at the faculty.

Humanities
History and Present Day:

The Faculty of Humanities of the Ivane Javakhishvili Tbilisi State University is the successor of the Faculty of Philosophy of the first Georgian University established in 1918.

The mission of the faculty is to promote the introduction of modern researches and methodologies, the development of scientific work and research-based educational activities in the fields of humanities.

Social and Political Sciences
In May 2005, during the university reforms, six faculties were established out of 22 faculties at Ivane Javakhishvili Tbilisi State University, the Faculty of Political and Social Sciences was one of them. The mission of the faculty is to prepare qualified specialists through education and research and to develop social science.

The faculty has seven educational-scientific directions and offers its students the following Bachelor, Master, and Doctoral programs:

Political Science, Journalism, International Relations, Human Geography, Sociology and Social Work.

Psychology and Educational Sciences 
In October 2014 the direction of psychology was separated from the Faculty of Social and Political Sciences, and the Teaching and Research Institute of Pedagogy was separated from the Faculty of Humanities. Thus, the Faculty of Psychology and Educational Sciences was established as a result of merger of the above-mentioned educational directions.
Presently about 1400 students are undergoing their studies at the Faculty of Psychology and Educational Sciences (three stages of education) and about 60 professors are teaching them; 4 bachelor's degree programs and up to 15 master's and doctoral degree programs are being implemented at the faculty.

Economics and Business
Faculty History:

The Faculty of Economics and Business was established as an independent entity at the Tbilisi State University in 1931 on the basis of the Social-Economic Faculty founded in 1922. Until 1944, the Faculty of Economics was the first and the only educational and research center in the country. Now nearly all Georgian universities offer courses in economics, where lectures are delivered by the alumni of the Faculty of Economics.

Until 2005 four faculties of the Tbilisi State University (Faculty of Economics, Microeconomics and Management, Marketing and Commerce, International Business) were preparing specialists in the field of economic and business. Establishment of the Faculty of Economics and Business, which is the largest faculty at the Tbilisi State University, is the result of the reforms that have been carried out in Georgian educational system and in TSU in 2005.

Law
The country's political unification and strengthening, economic growth and development created all necessary grounds for cultural development in Georgia that can perfectly be confirmed by the existence of cultural-educational centers of Gelati and Ikalto.

Medicine
The history of higher medical education originates from October 1918 when the Faculty of Medicine was established at the Tbilisi State University. Since May 1919, by decision of the Board of Professors, the Medical Faculty continued to exist as an independent unit until 1930 when the Tbilisi State Medical Institute was founded on the basis of the Medical Faculty.

In 1995, higher medical education was restored at Ivane Javakhishvili Tbilisi State University, first at the Faculty of Biology and Medicine as medical specialization, and in 2000 as an independent faculty.

The faculty runs one-tier academic programs for physicians and dentists. Since 2006, within the framework of TEMPUS project, there has been operating a new bachelor program in occupational therapy in full accordance with the Bologna Process and Tuning Methodology. In clinical and theoretical departments of the faculty, teaching process is conducted in the leading medical institutions. Distinguished students receive professional training in Germany, at the academic study clinics of the Universities of Leipzig and Dresden.
 
The faculty is running alternative to residency post-diploma academic programs, as well as Master's (Public Health, Epidemiology and Biostatistics) and Doctoral programs.

Institution and administration
TSU has no central campus, its buildings are spread over the city. The oldest building is #1 where the administration of the university is seated. In the yard of the 1st TSU campus lie the founders of Tbilisi State University, whose names imply establishment and development of various scientific schools in Georgia. The Pantheon of Tbilisi State University is one of the special cultural and historical places.

Board of Representatives
The Board of Representatives is the university representative body, which is elected by the faculties. Senate members are elected separately from the students and the academic personnel in proportion to their number at each structural unit.სიახლეები

The Board of Representatives is elected from within the university on the basis of general, direct and equal elections, by secret ballot. Students comprise one-third of the board. The board includes a representative from the University's library.

Academic Council
The Academic Council is the highest representative body of the university. Council is elected by the members of the faculties academic personnel and those representatives of students' self-governance who are the members of faculty council, on the basis of direct, free and equal elections, by secret ballot. Only professors may be elected as the members of the Academic Council.

Rector
The Rector is the highest academic authority of the university, serves as a chair of the Academic Council, represents the university in academic and research spheres both domestically and internationally. The Rector is elected by the majority vote of Academic Council members, through secret ballot.

Chancellor
The Chancellor is the highest administrative manager at the university in the sphere of financial issues, material and human resources and represents the institution in financial and economic relationships.

The Chancellor is nominated by the Academic Council and approved by the Board of Representatives, through secret ballot. The term of office of the Chancellor is four years.

Other
There are museums of History, Georgian Emigration, Mineralogy, Geology and Paleontology, Geography, Zoology and Botany.

The five dormitories can accommodate up to 2200 living rooms.

The University has eight branches in Sukhumi, Meskheti, Ozurgeti, Sighnaghi (kakheti), Zugdidi, Qvemo Qartli (Marneuli), Javakheti and Poti.

University schools are Ivane Javakhishvili school N53, the N. Muskhelishvili school N55, prof. T. Georgia physical-mathematical boarding school, Tbilisi lyceum, Rustavi gymnasium, Gurjaani college and Khobi school.

Affiliations
The university has contacts with foreign scientific and educational centres:

RWTH Aachen University, University of Saarland and Jena University (Germany), Emory University and Georgia State University (USA), Saint Mary's University (Canada), Warsaw University and University of Łódź (Poland), University of Málaga and University of Salamanca (Spain), Nantes, Paris 8, Paris 13, Grenoble and Toulon Universities (France), Bristol Polytechnical Institute, Brunel and London Universities (Great Britain), Budapest Eötvös Loránd University (Hungary), Bilkent, Trabzon Black Sea and Ankara Universities (Turkey),  Palermo, Rome and Sapienza, Piza and Venice Universities (Italy), Athens, Pirueus, Ioanina and Saloniki Universities (Greece), International Centre of Nuclear Physics, Aarhus University (Denmark), Bucharest University (Romania), University of Vienna (Austria), Tehran and Gilan Universities (Iran), Cairo University (Egypt). TSU has relations with Association of European Universities, UNESCO, the Council of Europe and other international organizations.

Rectors
Petre Melikishvili   -  1918/I - 1919/XII
Ivane Javakhishvili  - 1919/XII -1926/VI
Tedo Ghlonti  - 1926/IX - 1928/IX
Malakia Toroshelidze  - 1928/IX - 1930/IX
Ivane Vashakmadze  - 1930/I - 1931/IX
Aleksandre Erkomaishvili  - 1931/X - 1932/XII
Levan Agniashvili   - 1933/IV - 1935/VI
Karlo Oragvelidze  - 1935/VI - 1937/VI
Giorgi Kiknadze - 1937/VII - 1938/IX
Davit Kipshidze - 1938/X - 1942/II
Aleksandre Janelidze  - 1942/II - 1945/VII
Nikoloz Ketskhoveli  - 1945/VII - 1953/VI
Ilia Vekua  - 1953/VII - 1953/IX,  1966/IV - 1972/IV
Ermile Burchuladze  - 1953/IX - 1954/IX
Victor Kupradze  - 1954/IX - 1958/III
Giorgi Dzotsenidze  - 1958/IV - 1959/III
Evgeni Kharadze - 1959/III - 1966/III
Davit Chkhikvishvili  - 1972/V - 1980/II
Vazha Okujava  - 1980/III - 1985/IX
Nodar Amaghlobeli - 1985/IX - 1991/VIII
Tamaz Gamkrelidze  - 1991/VIII - 1991/IX
Otar Japaridze  - 1991/IX - 1991/X
Roin Metreveli - 1991/X - 2004/X
Rusudan Lortkipanidze  - 2004/XII-2006/IV
Giorgi Khubua - 2006/IV - 2010/VIII
Alexander Kvitashvili - 2010/VIII - 2013/VII
Vladimer Papava - 2013/VII - 2016/III
Darejan Tvaltvadze (acting) - 2016/IV - 2016/IX
Giorgi Sharvashidze - 2016/IX - 2022/X
Jaba Samushia - (Acting Rector) 2022/X - 2022/XII) — Rector 2022/XII-

Alumni

Prime Ministers
Aleksandre Akhobadze
Giorgi Gakharia
Mamuka Bakhtadze
Giorgi Kvirikashvili
Irakli Garibashvili
Bidzina Ivanishvili
Giorgi Arsenishvili
Nikoloz Gilauri
Vladimer Gurgenidze
Zurab Zhvania

Speakers of the Parliament
Tamar Chugoshvili (acting)
Irakli Kobakhidze
Davit Usupashvili
David Bakradze
Nino Burjanadze

Others
Ilia Abuladze, philologist
Giuli Alasania, historian
Givi Alkhazishvili, author, poet, essayist
Diana Anphimiadi, poet
Tamar Beruchashvili, Minister of Foreign Affairs of Georgia
Vakhtang Butskhrikidze, CEO of TBC Bank
Arnold Chikobava, linguist
Levan Chilashvili, archaeologist
Juansher Chkareuli, physicist
Gia Dvali, physicist
Ana Dolidze, activist
Guranda Gvaladze, botanist
Evgen Gvaladze, lawyer and politician
Koba Gvenetadze, Governor of the National Bank of Georgia
Gia Getsadze, lawyer
Nikoloz Janashia, historian
Sergi Jikia, historian, orientalist and founder of the Turkology in Georgia.
Kakha Kaladze, politician and retired footballer
John Khetsuriani, lawyer
Dimitri Kumsishvili, Minister of Finance
David Lordkipanidze, anthropologist
Giwi Margwelaschwili, a philosopher, writer, Nobel Prize candidate
Giorgi Melikishvili, historian
Miho Mosulishvili, writer, playwright
Aka Morchiladze, writer
Jaba Mujiri, footballer
Gia Nodia, Minister of Education and Science of Georgia, politologist, political scientist
Irakli Okruashvili, politician
Bulat Okudjava, noted writer, poet, musician
Stepan Pachikov, founder of Evernote
Baia Pataraia, women's rights activist
Grigol Peradze, theologian and historian
Andrea Razmadze, mathematician, Tbilisi University co-founder
Viktor Saneyev, track and field athlete
Anna Schchian, botanist
Giorgi Targamadze, politician
Maya Tskitishvili, Minister of Regional Development and Infrastructure
Lasha Zhvania, politician, diplomat
Davit Osepashvili, political scientist, politician, public relations and media specialist

See also
 List of modern universities in Europe (1801–1945).

References

External links
Official website

 
Educational institutions established in 1918
1918 establishments in Georgia (country)
Vake, Tbilisi
Education in Tbilisi
Buildings and structures in Tbilisi